Cameron Creek is a stream in Alberta, Canada. Cameron Creek is named after D. R. Cameron, a government surveyor.

See also
List of rivers of Alberta

References

Rivers of Alberta